How the mighty fall may refer to:
 James C. Collins book,  How the Mighty Fall: And Why Some Companies Never Give In
 How the Mighty Fall, a Mark Owen album